Gloria Calderón Kellett is an American writer, producer, director and actress. 
 
She is best known as the executive producer, co-creator, co-showrunner, director, and actress on the sitcom One Day at a Time. Her Amazon Original series, With Love, is the first series coming out of a deal between her company, Glonation and Amazon Studios. Along with Blumhouse Television and Spotify, Glonation is also producing The Horror of Dolores Roach based on the Gimlet podcast.

The daughter of Cuban immigrants, Calderón Kellett graduated from Loyola Marymount University and went on to earn a master's degree in Theatre from the University of London. She spent her early years as a writer/producer on shows including Devious Maids, Rules of Engagement, and How I Met Your Mother. Her acting credits include Jane the Virgin, Angie Tribeca, Dead to Me, How I Met Your Mother, and One Day at a Time. She also appeared as a narrator on Drunk History (New Orleans). In directing, Calderón Kellett has worked on episodes of One Day at a Time, Mr. Iglesias, Merry Happy Whatever, United We Fall, and the Mad About You revival. Her first feature film We Were There, Too co-written by Natasha Rothwell is set up at HBO Max.

She is an ambassador for the non-profit ReFrame and launched a "Hollywood 101" web series with Buzzfeed's PeroLike.

Early life and education
Kellett was born in Portland, Oregon on April 11, 1975. She is Cuban in ancestry. Kellett grew up in Beaverton, Oregon and San Diego, California. She graduated from University of San Diego High School. Kellett graduated from Loyola Marymount University in 1997 with a BA in Communications and Theater Arts. She also attended courses at the Writers Boot Camp in Santa Monica, CA.

Kellett was awarded a Kennedy Center/ACTF Achievement in Playwriting Award for her first play, Plane Strangers, which also went on to win the Del Rey Players Achievement in Playwriting Award, and the LMU Playwright of the Year Award. Kellett went on to earn a MA in Theatre from Goldsmith College, University of London. Her play, When Words Are Many was a finalist for the London Writers Award (Waterstone's Prize). Her co-authored play Dance Like No One's Looking won the International Student Playscript Competition, judged and awarded by Sir Alan Ayckbourn. While in London, she worked at the Royal Court Theater and LIFT (the London International Festival of Theatre).

Career
Since her return to Los Angeles, Kellett has been a founding member of the sketch comedy group And Donkey Makes Five, and has written and performed stand-up comedy at The Improv and The Comedy Store. In a successful screenplay collaboration, Kellett's script Passengers and Drivers made it to the semi-finalist round of the first Project Greenlight Competition and she worked for Academy Award-winning writer/director Cameron Crowe on Vanilla Sky.

Kellett was a writer, actress (episode "The Wedding Bride"), executive story editor, and co-producer on the CBS series, How I Met Your Mother, for which she was won an ALMA Award for Outstanding Script in a Drama or Comedy. She has been a writer and supervising producer and writer on the CBS series, Rules of Engagement, on Lifetime's Devious Maids and on ABC's Mixology, the CW series, iZombie and the ABC series, United We Fall. She is the co-showrunner of One Day at a Time which was released on Netflix for the first three seasons, and is currently airing its fourth season on Pop TV. Along with the other writers, producers and the cast, she helped to pitch the show to other networks to ensure the show did not end.

She has also acted in several shows such as Trophy Wife, Jane the Virgin, Dead to Me, and One Day at a Time.

Her professional directorial debut was on her show One Day at a Time and she has gone on to direct several other episodes. She has also directed for Mr. Iglesias, also on Netflix.

Kellett is also a lecturer in Screenwriting at Loyola Marymount University's School of Film and Television.

Personal life
Kellett met cartoonist Dave Kellett, creator of the webcomic Sheldon, in high school. The couple married on February 24, 2001.

Authored works
Her book, Accessories - 30 Monologues for Women has been translated into Italian and is published by Small Fish Studios in the U.S. and Cassini Press in Italy.

References

External links
 

21st-century American dramatists and playwrights
American stand-up comedians
Living people
Loyola Marymount University alumni
People from Beaverton, Oregon
American people of Cuban descent
American women comedians
American women dramatists and playwrights
American women screenwriters
American women television writers
Alumni of the University of London
21st-century American women writers
Screenwriters from Oregon
21st-century American comedians
1975 births
American television writers
21st-century American screenwriters
Showrunners